Luckunnodu is a 2017 Telugu-language action comedy film directed by Raj Kiran. The film stars Vishnu Manchu and Hansika Motwani. It marks the acting debut of producer M. V. V. Satyanarayana as a villain.

Plot 
A gangster robs a bank, but another person steals his theft and hands the bag full of money to Lucky, a young man who is known for his coincidence of bad luck with good luck. Frustrated and restless, Lucky is determined to regain the possession of his loot.

Cast 
Vishnu Manchu as Lucky
Hansika Motwani as Positive  Padma
M.V.V. Satyanarayana as JK, a Mumbai-based business man
Vennela Kishore  as the C.E.O. of Kony Solutions
Tanikella Bharani as Padmarao, Padma's Father
Raghu Babu as Lucky's Uncle
Jayaprakash as Bhakthavatsalam, Lucky's Father
Posani Krishna Murali as Shaik Nayeem
Suresh as Police Commissioner 
Satyam Rajesh as Lucky's friend 
Thagubothu Ramesh
Fish Venkat as JK's henchman 
Prabhas Sreenu as Pulihora, a thief
Lucinda Nicholas as Lavanya
Shravan as Anthony, JK's henchman
Mohan Babu as himself in the song "What Da F"

Production 
Director Raj Kiran, who was known for directing the film Geethanjali announced his next project with Vishnu Manchu in the lead role. The name Luckunnodu was finalized after previous movies with similar names had been successful due to their catchy names including Speedunnodu and Sarrainodu.

Hansika Motwani was selected to play the female lead opposite Vishnu, marking her third collaboration with him after Denikaina Ready and Pandavulu Pandavulu Tummeda.

Soundtrack 
Praveen Lakkaraju composed all of the music except for one song, "Ravera", which was composed by Achu Rajamani. All the songs were released under the Silly Monks Music label with the song "O Siri Malli" being released under the Sony Music label.

Release 
Luckunnodu released in January 2017 and was expected to clash with Si3. This film was saved at box office as the latter's release date was postponed.

References

External links 
 

2017 films
Films scored by Achu Rajamani
2010s Telugu-language films
2010s masala films
Indian action comedy films
2017 action comedy films
Indian heist films